Agonidium dilaticolle is a species of ground beetle in the subfamily Platyninae. It was described by Henry Walter Bates in 1892.

References

dilaticolle
Beetles described in 1892